The O'Shannassy River is a perennial river of the Port Phillip catchment, located in the north-eastern Greater Metropolitan Melbourne region of the Australian state of Victoria.

Location and features

The river flows generally south by southwest, joined by two minor tributaries, before being impounded to create the O'Shannassy Reservoir, part of Melbourne's water supply system.

The O’Shannassy River catchment is identified as an Essentially Natural Catchment by the Land Conservation Council.

Etymology
The river is named after John O'Shanassy , the second Premier of Victoria.

See also

References

Melbourne Water catchment
Rivers of Greater Melbourne (region)
Tributaries of the Yarra River
Yarra Ranges